The  is a Japanese private women's university located in Hiroo, Shibuya, Tokyo.

It was established in 1916 as a special school (senmon gakkō) by the Society of the Sacred Heart. It became a university in 1948 and is one of the oldest women's universities in Japan.

Departments
The University has one faculty of Liberal Arts, with the following departments:
Department of English Language and Literature
Department of Japanese Language and Literature
Department of History and Social Sciences
Department of Philosophy
Department of Education

It also has a graduate school of arts offering master's degrees and doctorates in these subjects.

Affiliated schools
Sacred Heart School in Tokyo
International School of the Sacred Heart

Notable alumnae 
 Eriko Yamatani, politician
 Makiko Fujino, politician
 Empress Michiko
 Sadako Ogata, scholar, former United Nations High Commissioner for Refugees
 Mariko Ōhara, author
 Ayako Sono, author
 Ikumi Yoshimatsu, Miss International 2012 (first Japanese to do so)
 Momoko Abe, Miss Universe Japan 2017

See also
 Sacred Heart Professional Training College

External links
University of the Sacred Heart

References

Private universities and colleges in Japan
Universities and colleges in Tokyo
Women's universities and colleges in Japan
Educational institutions established in 1916
Sacred Heart universities and colleges
1916 establishments in Japan
Catholic universities and colleges in Japan